Estêvão da Gama (c. 1470) was a Portuguese navigator and explorer, discoverer of the Trindade and Martim Vaz islands (in modern Brazil).

Estêvão da Gama was Vasco da Gama's cousin, son of his cousin Aires da Gama, as explained by Manuel de Faria e Sousa, in its work Ásia Portuguesa (1675). He was Captain-major of the Portuguese army in India in 1503.

See also 

 4th Portuguese India Armada (Gama, 1502)

1470s births
Year of death unknown
Portuguese explorers of South America
16th-century explorers
Portuguese navigators
Maritime history of Portugal
15th-century Portuguese people
16th-century Portuguese people
Estevao